Henry Perrine Baldwin High School is a public high school in Wailuku, Hawaii.  Serving in the major commercial, industrial, and municipal communities of the island of Maui, its curriculum offers a wide range of courses, including Advanced Placement courses. Henry Perrine Baldwin High School was accredited in 2012 by the Western Association of Schools & Colleges for a period of six years. Henry Perrine Baldwin High School is operating under School/Community-Based Management.

Campus
The school opened in 1938 and moved to its current building in 1940. It was named for Henry Perrine Baldwin (1842–1911), co-founder of the Alexander & Baldwin corporation; his son, Henry Alexander Baldwin, broke ground for the 1940 school.  The campus features the bronze sculpture Kū Kilakila (1997) by Honolulu-born Joel H. K. Nakila.

Notable alumni 

Candis Cayne, actress and performance artist. The first transgender actress to play a recurring transgender character in prime time. 
 Jessie Kuhaulua, aka Takamiyama Daigorō, first foreign-born sumo wrestler to win a top division championship
 Kurt Suzuki, MLB catcher for the Los Angeles Angels
 Kaluka Maiava, NFL free agent linebacker
 John Lotulelei, NFL linebacker for the Jacksonville Jaguars
 Kendall Grove, former UFC MMA fighter
 JoJo Dickson, NFL free agent linebacker
Vili Tolutaʻu, Flanker for the Seattle Seawolves of Major League Rugby and United States national rugby union team
Donan Cruz, Head Coach for Ball State Men's Volleyball
Mapuana Makia, Actress, (Doogie Kamealoha, M.D, Finding Ohana, Aloha)

Gallery

References

External links

Official site

School buildings on the National Register of Historic Places in Hawaii
School buildings completed in 1938
Public high schools in Maui
1938 establishments in Hawaii
Educational institutions established in 1938
National Register of Historic Places in Maui County, Hawaii
Hawaii Register of Historic Places